Endre Hellestveit (born 7 August 1976 in Rosendal in Kvinnherad) is a Norwegian actor.  He plays Isachsen in the Varg Veum series of crime films.

Education
Hellestveit was previously a ski instructor at Gautefall in Telemark before he joined the military service in Norway. He was there for just two years and served in their diving squad. He then continued his studies in Australia, but ended up at BI Norwegian Business School in Bergen. He was then taken up by the Norwegian National Academy of Theatre in Oslo.

Filmography

References

1976 births
Living people
Norwegian male television actors
People from Kvinnherad